Clarence Fahnestock Memorial State Park, also known as Fahnestock State Park, is a  state park located in Putnam and Dutchess counties, New York. The park has hiking trails, a beach on Canopus Lake, and fishing on four ponds and two lakes. Spanning parts of the towns of Putnam Valley, Kent, and Carmel, most of the park is situated in northern Putnam County between the Taconic State Parkway and U.S. Route 9.

During the winter season, part of the park functions as the Fahnestock Winter Park. The park also includes an environmental center known as the Taconic Outdoor Education Center.

History

Description

Clarence Fahnestock State Park includes a lake (Canopus), a pond (Pelton), a beach, picnic tables with pavilions, a playground, recreation programs, a nature trail, hiking and biking, a bridle path, seasonal turkey and deer hunting, fishing and ice fishing, a campground with tent and trailer sites, a boat launch with boat rentals, and a food concession.

The park's forests form part of the Northeastern coastal forests ecoregion.

Fahnestock Winter Park
Contained within Clarence Fahnestock State Park is Fahnestock Winter Park, which is open from December through March, depending on conditions. The winter park offers sledding (tube only), cross-country skiing, snowshoeing, recreation programs and a nature trail. Equipment rental, lessons, and a food concession are available.

See also

 Glynwood Center
 List of New York state parks

References

External links

 New York State Parks: Clarence Fahnestock State Park
 New York State Parks: Fahnestock Winter Park
 New York State Parks: Taconic Outdoor Education Center
 New York-New Jersey Trail Conference: Clarence Fahnestock Memorial State Park

State parks of New York (state)
Parks in Dutchess County, New York
Parks in Putnam County, New York